Halvor Bache Guldahl (18 March 1859 – 10 October 1931) was a Norwegian jurist, businessman and County Governor of Nord-Trøndelag.

He was born in the village of Beitstad in Nord-Trøndelag, Norway. After graduating in law, he worked at Inderøy District Court. He then started as a solicitor in Steinkjer. He was co-founder of Innherreds Kreditbank in 1887, and was the first bank director. From 1894 to 1902, he managed  Ogndalsbruket, an operating company for forestry and related resources in the municipal.

Guldahl was acting county governor from 1898 to 1902, while Ole Anton Qvam was member of Parliament and later government minister. He was appointed county governor again in 1916, and sat until 1927. As county governor, he was one of the leading initiatives to found the county-owned power company Nord-Trøndelag Elektrisitetsverk and the bus company Fylkesbilene i Nord-Trøndelag. He was Fylkesbilene's first chair.

He died in October 1931 in Oslo. His will left large assets, including a collection of paintings, to Nord-Trøndelag County Municipality.

References

1859 births
1931 deaths
People from Steinkjer
Norwegian jurists
Norwegian bankers
People in bus transport
County governors of Norway